Ovacık  is a village in Silifke district of Mersin Province, Turkey. It is situated in the southern slopes of Toros Mountains and to the north of Silifke. Ovacık is situated in a region full of archaeological ruins. The population of Ovacık is 993  as of 2011.

References

Villages in Silifke District
Yaylas in Turkey